Senator Pepoon may refer to:

Percy Pepoon (1861–1939), Missouri State Senate
Theodore Pepoon (1836–1910), Nebraska State Senate